Mohamed Sarsar (born 25 June 1961) is a Tunisian volleyball player. He competed at the 1984 Summer Olympics and the 1988 Summer Olympics.

References

1961 births
Living people
Tunisian men's volleyball players
Olympic volleyball players of Tunisia
Volleyball players at the 1984 Summer Olympics
Volleyball players at the 1988 Summer Olympics
Place of birth missing (living people)